Aporrea is a Venezuelan website that publishes news and opinions from a left-wing perspective. It ranks as the fourth most visited local political site in the country, according to site metrics Alexa.com, and it claims to be the first among local independent left-leaning outlets. Most of the site'a content was supportive of the political changes championed by late president Hugo Chávez, but in recent years, it heavily carries opinions and news articles critical of the current government led by Chavez's protégé Nicolas Maduro, turning it into a "gathering place for dissidence within chavismo".

Aporrea is made up of volunteers who, depending on their personal and work commitments, donate their time to insert the news, complaints, post opinion articles and take to the streets to cover events not covered by other media outlets.

History
Aporrea was created after the 2002 Venezuelan coup d'état attempt to "defend the gains of the 1999 Constitution of the Bolivarian Republic of Venezuela and the will of the people". The site was created by Gonzalo Gómez and Martin Sánchez, who withdrew in 2004 to take up a post as diplomat for the Venezuelan government.

Since 2010, the Venezuelan government stopped contracting advertisement on the site, forcing it to run commercial ads. Advertising on the site remains free for cooperatives, small businesses and NGOs.

Censorship 
Aporrea is currently censored in Venezuelan government owned Internet service providers. Since February 2019, the site is unreachable to users of Cantv and Movilnet, the State ISPs, which make serve the majority of the country's population. Other local independent media outlets are also affected.

The site has been the target of state sponsored attacks aimed at silencing it. "Even media claiming to maintain a neutral position, such as Aporrea, were attacked," said Freedom House in one of its reports on Internet freedom in Venezuela.

Policies
The site claims that the opinions it publishes "currently reflect the complex and diverse nature of the left in Venezuela, which gravitates from enthusiastic support for any measure or policy of the current government, to its absolute rejection, with infinite variants (critical support, slight opposition, neutrality, etc.). Aporrea as a team, does not take a public position in this regard, and seeks to remain open to the debate of all the tendencies of the Venezuelan left."

Although the site claims to take no official sides in Venezuela's political situation, its current director, Gonzalo Gómez, is known for his opposition to the Maduro government. "Maduro deserves to be recalled," said Gomez in reference to a recall referendum against the president. According to Gomez, Aporrea's role as an independent left wing outlet is pivotal, as content critical of government policies "have no space in State owned media".

Aporrea, according to its website, does not support any kind of discrimination based on "race, sexual orientation, national or ethnic origin, religious affiliation, gender, disability status, skin color, accent when speaking, etc.". The website lists rules for opinion articles, one of which asks that users "try to be respectful, especially when referring to other columnists of Aporrea or figures of the Bolivarian Government or the left in general, with whom you may have disagreements. We suggest that criticisms and replies to other articles be restricted to responding to arguments, not personal attacks or insults. We reserve the right to reject material which offends, defames, or humiliates others".

Critical reception
Venezuelan Government figures have publicly criticized the site. Diosdado Cabello, the current President of the National Constituent Assembly described Aporrea and its columnists as traitors. "Write everything you want, but enough of betrayals! You can write everything you want, nobody forbids it, you are within your rights, but define yourself [politically]."

According to Manuel Laya of the Communist Party of Venezuela, Aporrea no longer serves its original purpose and was an instrument of the "fifth column" to hinder the flow of information.

According to the Anti-Defamation League (ADL), Aporrea has "a record of promoting antisemitic conspiracies" and presented multiple articles which they found offensive in their 2014 Antisemitismo en Venezuela report. The Simon Wiesenthal Center also criticized what it considers anti-Semitic commentary on the website. Several other organizations have also criticized the website citing anti-Semitic ideas. Aporrea attacked both the Anti-Defamation League and the Simon Wiesenthal Center, criticizing that the organizations for not contacting Aporrea to ask the content to be removed and for condemning the website's editorial stance on Israel.

References

External links
 

Internet properties established in 2002
Spanish-language websites
Bolivarian Revolution
Propaganda in Venezuela
Political Internet forums
Venezuelan news websites